HMS Thunder Child is a fictional ironclad torpedo ram of the Royal Navy, destroyed by Martian fighting-machines in H. G. Wells' 1898 novel The War of the Worlds whilst protecting a refugee rescue fleet of civilian vessels. It has been suggested that Thunder Child was based on HMS Polyphemus, which was the sole torpedo ram to see service with the Royal Navy from 1881 to 1903.  However, given that Thunder Child is described by Wells as a huge ship with twin funnels and guns sufficiently powerful to destroy a Martian tripod with a single hit, it's unlikely that the diminutive single-funnelled and lightly armed Polyphemus was actually meant to be the model for the fictional ship.

Fictional description
In the novel Wells gives only a rough description of the ship. After the narrator talks about his brother, he introduces us to the Thunder Child in chapter 17, describing her thus: "About a couple of miles out lay an ironclad, very low in the water, almost, to my brother's perception, like a water-logged ship. This was the ram Thunder Child". A few paragraphs later, it is stated that "It was the torpedo ram, Thunder Child, steaming headlong, coming to the rescue of the threatened shipping". The battle takes place off the mouth of the River Blackwater, Essex, where people from London are escaping the Martian offensive. Three Martian fighting-machines having approached the vessels from the seaward side. HMS Thunder Child signals to the main fleet and steams at full speed towards the Martians without firing. The Martians, whom the narrator suggests are unfamiliar with large warships (having come from an arid planet) at first use only a gas attack. When this fails to have any effect, they employ their Heat-Ray, inflicting fatal damage on the Thunder Child. The ship continues to attack, bringing down one of the fighting machines with its gun, even as it succumbs. The flaming wreckage of the ironclad finally rams into a second fighting-machine, destroying it. When the black smoke and super-heated steam banks dissipate, both the Thunder Child and the third fighting-machine are gone. The attack by Thunder Child occupies the Martians long enough for three Royal Navy warships of the main Channel Fleet to arrive.

Adaptations
HMS Thunder Child is commonly omitted from some adaptations or replaced outright with technology more appropriate to the updated settings. 

In Orson Welles's famous 1938 radio adaptation of The War of the Worlds, a Boeing B-17 Flying Fortress heavy bomber replaces Thunder Child; it collides with a fighting-machine after being critically damaged by its Heat-Ray.

In the George Pal 1953 film adaptation, the last-ditch defense against the Martians is an atomic bomb dropped by a Thunder Child replacement, a Northrop YB-49 Flying Wing jet bomber; the atomic bomb proves useless, because the Martian fighting-machines are protected by individual force fields.

The first adaptation to feature HMS Thunder Child was Jeff Wayne's Musical Version of ''The War of the Worlds'', which was released in 1978 and retains the novel's Victorian setting, characters, and situations. The album features the song, "Thunder Child". The album's cover art depicts a Canopus-class battleship fighting a Martian tripod. This version of Thunder Child is based upon the naval painting depicting the Battle of Coronel (1 November 1914). The War of the Worlds was written as an account of fictional 1897 events and the lead ship of the class, HMS Canopus, did not enter service until 1899. The vessel in the painting is therefore a member of the Majestic-class, like HMS Mars commissioned in 1896. 

The 1999 video game adaptation of Jeff Wayne's musical features a level revolving around Thunder Child. The player is placed in control of the ironclad and must sail it down a river while using its cannons to destroy Martian machines and settlements; the level ends in a climactic confrontation with Tempest, a powerful Martian war machine.

In Steven Spielberg's 2005 film adaptation, War of the Worlds, contemporary American military forces use tanks and attack helicopters against the alien Tripods, again without success. Earlier in the film, civilian ferries trying to escape from the Tripods are trapped and easily sunk, with no intervention by a warship.

The low-budget direct-to-DVD Pendragon feature adaptation of the novel, released in 2005, uses poor CGI to portray HMS Thunder Child as a Royal Navy . 

In the BBC's 2019 TV miniseries, the main characters join up again on the Essex coast, where many small boats are gathering  civilians to ferry them out to anchored ships. A Martian Tripod appears and several warships open fire on it with their main batteries. Most of the warships are at quite a distance offshore, but one, which could be Thunder Child, is much closer. The Tripod is hit on one its the legs and in its command cupola, and immediately collapses. A second Martian machine appears on the beach, chasing the protagonists. Before it can activate its Heat-Ray, it is struck by multiple naval artillery shells. It falls forward, narrowly missing crushing the protagonists. As in H.G. Wells’ original novel, the refugees manage to escape, while none of the warships are shown being destroyed by the Tripods.

The 2013 science fiction novel The Last Days of Thunder Child, written by C. A. Powell, is set in Victorian Britain of 1898.

See also
 List of fictional ships
 The War of the Worlds
 H. G. Wells

References

External links
 

Fictional ships of the Royal Navy
The War of the Worlds